Euastacus maidae is a species of Australian crayfish in the family Parastacidae. It is known only from a single catchment in the Gold Coast hinterland in the State of Queensland, Australia, and is listed as critically endangered on the IUCN Red List. The stream is surrounded by Subtropical Rainforest. This species may also occur in adjacent high rainfall catchments.

References

Freshwater crustaceans of Australia
Endangered fauna of Australia
Crustaceans described in 1956
maidae
Taxonomy articles created by Polbot